The Museum of Turkish Calligraphy Art is a museum located in Beyazıt Square in Fatih district of Istanbul, Turkey. 

Constructed between 1506 and 1508, the building formerly served as the medrese of Bayezid II Complex which was built within the order of Sultan Bayezid II, son of Mehmed the Conqueror. Its collection consists of 3121 pieces mainly reflecting Islamic calligraphic art.

History 
The museum was first opened as the "Writing Museum" at the medrese of Yavuz Selim Complex in 1968. In 1984, it was moved to its present location and renamed "Museum of Turkish Calligraphy Art".

See also
Calligraphy
Turkish and Islamic Arts Museum
Topkapı Palace
Caferağa Medresseh
List of art museums

References

Art museums and galleries in Istanbul
Islamic museums